Glinjeni may refer to several places in Moldova:

Glinjeni, Făleşti, a commune in Făleşti district
Glinjeni, Şoldăneşti, a commune in Şoldăneşti district